Odontobutis platycephala is a species of freshwater sleeper endemic to South Korea.

References

Fish of East Asia
Odontobutis
Fish described in 1985